Steven B. Haas is chief of the Knee Service at Hospital for Special Surgery (HSS) and has developed multiple innovative surgical techniques and instrumentations to improve and facilitate knee replacements. Haas has been awarded numerous patents for his initiatives. One of Haas's most significant contributions to knee surgery was developing the Minimally Invasive Knee Replacement, which allowed patients to have much smaller scars and speedier recoveries. Haas has been listed on New York magazine's annual "Best Doctors in New York" list since 2007 and has more than 100 orthopedics-related publications. He travels to present on topics pertaining to knee surgery.

Early life and education
Haas was born to Dorothy and Curt Haas in Scranton, Pennsylvania. As a boy, Haas was always interested in construction and tinkering, and at age 11 renovated his mother's kitchen and paneled his room unassisted. Playing defensive linebacker on the Scranton Central high school football team, he helped launch the team to victory as the Pennsylvania Eastern Conference champions. Haas went on to play football at the University of Rochester. He graduated Phi Beta Kappa in 1981 and Alpha Omega Alpha (National Honor Medical Society) from University of Rochester School of Medicine and Dentistry in 1985. After receiving his M.D. and MPH from Rochester, Haas interned at Harvard University affiliated hospitals.

Career
Haas completed his residency in Orthopedic Surgery and fellowship in Knee Surgery at Hospital for Special Surgery (HSS). He acts as Chief of the Knee Service, John N. Insall Chair, and Attending Orthopedic Surgeon at HSS. Haas is also a Professor of Clinical Orthopedic Surgery at the Weill Cornell Medical College. Dr. Haas is a member of the American Academy of Orthopedic Surgeons, the American Association of Hip and Knee Surgeons, and the Knee Society.

Innovations & patents
Haas has been awarded nine other patents for his instrumental work in orthopedics, including a patella cutting clamp and several knee prostheses. Haas's innovations include his High Performance Knee Implants that bend and rotate more normally and Patient Specific Knee Instruments that allow for knee replacements to be more precisely fit and personalized. In addition to inventing new hardware and techniques, Haas has also pioneered new software technologies in Orthopedics. His software, OpLogix and OrthoSecure, are the first computerized systems that confirm accurate implant selection for each patient during surgery.

Awards, media presence, and publications
Haas authors over 100 publications and has been featured by media outlets such as CBS News, WABC News, and U.S. News & World Report.

References

Living people
1959 births
People from Scranton, Pennsylvania
University of Rochester alumni
American orthopedic surgeons